Enişdibi (also, Enishdibi and Ehishdibi) is a village in the Ismailli Rayon of Azerbaijan.  The village forms part of the municipality of Quşəncə.

References 

Populated places in Ismayilli District